The Vladivostok constituency (No.62) is a Russian legislative constituency in the Primorsky Krai. Until 2007 the constituency covered the entire city of Vladivostok and nearby Artyom. However, in 2016 the constituency was gerrymandered as Vladivostok was split between 2 constituencies. In its current configuration Vladivostok constituency covers central Vladivostok and western Primorsky Krai, which previously was a part of dismantled Ussuriysk constituency.

Members elected

Election results

1993

|-
! colspan=2 style="background-color:#E9E9E9;text-align:left;vertical-align:top;" |Candidate
! style="background-color:#E9E9E9;text-align:left;vertical-align:top;" |Party
! style="background-color:#E9E9E9;text-align:right;" |Votes
! style="background-color:#E9E9E9;text-align:right;" |%
|-
|style="background-color:"|
|align=left|Mikhail Glubokovsky
|align=left|Yavlinsky–Boldyrev–Lukin
|
|20.90%
|-
|style="background-color:"|
|align=left|Nikolay Zolotov
|align=left|Liberal Democratic Party
| -
|10.60%
|-
| colspan="5" style="background-color:#E9E9E9;"|
|- style="font-weight:bold"
| colspan="3" style="text-align:left;" | Total
| 
| 100%
|-
| colspan="5" style="background-color:#E9E9E9;"|
|- style="font-weight:bold"
| colspan="4" |Source:
|
|}

1995

|-
! colspan=2 style="background-color:#E9E9E9;text-align:left;vertical-align:top;" |Candidate
! style="background-color:#E9E9E9;text-align:left;vertical-align:top;" |Party
! style="background-color:#E9E9E9;text-align:right;" |Votes
! style="background-color:#E9E9E9;text-align:right;" |%
|-
|style="background-color:"|
|align=left|Vladimir Shakhov
|align=left|Independent
|
|22.62%
|-
|style="background-color:#5A5A58"|
|align=left|Viktor Cherepkov
|align=left|Federal Democratic Movement
|
|16.56%
|-
|style="background-color:"|
|align=left|Oleg Logunov
|align=left|Independent
|
|13.25%
|-
|style="background-color:"|
|align=left|Mikhail Glubokovsky (incumbent)
|align=left|Yabloko
|
|8.76%
|-
|style="background-color:"|
|align=left|Yevgeny Bolshakov
|align=left|Liberal Democratic Party
|
|7.00%
|-
|style="background-color:"|
|align=left|Aleksandr Bondarenko
|align=left|Independent
|
|6.48%
|-
|style="background-color:"|
|align=left|Igor Lukyanov
|align=left|Independent
|
|4.76%
|-
|style="background-color:"|
|align=left|Nikolay Martynyuk
|align=left|Independent
|
|2.53%
|-
|style="background-color:#D50000"|
|align=left|Vitaly Yurchenko
|align=left|Communists and Working Russia - for the Soviet Union
|
|2.22%
|-
|style="background-color:#2C299A"|
|align=left|Artur Korolkov
|align=left|Congress of Russian Communities
|
|2.02%
|-
|style="background-color:"|
|align=left|Vladimir Khodosov
|align=left|Independent
|
|1.64%
|-
|style="background-color:"|
|align=left|Vladimir Kapysh
|align=left|Independent
|
|1.44%
|-
|style="background-color:#CE1100"|
|align=left|Pyotr Gaponyuk
|align=left|My Fatherland
|
|0.83%
|-
|style="background-color:#000000"|
|colspan=2 |against all
|
|7.33%
|-
| colspan="5" style="background-color:#E9E9E9;"|
|- style="font-weight:bold"
| colspan="3" style="text-align:left;" | Total
| 
| 100%
|-
| colspan="5" style="background-color:#E9E9E9;"|
|- style="font-weight:bold"
| colspan="4" |Source:
|
|}

1999
A by-election was scheduled after Against all line received the most votes.

|-
! colspan=2 style="background-color:#E9E9E9;text-align:left;vertical-align:top;" |Candidate
! style="background-color:#E9E9E9;text-align:left;vertical-align:top;" |Party
! style="background-color:#E9E9E9;text-align:right;" |Votes
! style="background-color:#E9E9E9;text-align:right;" |%
|-
|style="background-color:"|
|align=left|Galina Dubovik
|align=left|Unity
|
|11.01%
|-
|style="background-color:#7C273A"|
|align=left|Vladimir Boruchenko
|align=left|Movement in Support of the Army
|
|10.49%
|-
|style="background-color:"|
|align=left|Gennady Kucherenko
|align=left|Independent
|
|9.93%
|-
|style="background-color:"|
|align=left|Sergey Solovyov
|align=left|Independent
|
|9.50%
|-
|style="background-color:"|
|align=left|Anatoly Vasyanovich
|align=left|Independent
|
|9.42%
|-
|style="background-color:"|
|align=left|Vladimir Nikiforov
|align=left|Yabloko
|
|5.60%
|-
|style="background-color:"|
|align=left|Aleksandr Terentyev
|align=left|Independent
|
|5.43%
|-
|style="background-color:"|
|align=left|Vitaly Bakanov
|align=left|Independent
|
|4.86%
|-
|style="background-color:"|
|align=left|Vladimir Shakhov (incumbent)
|align=left|Independent
|
|4.44%
|-
|style="background-color:"|
|align=left|Vasily Shirshikov
|align=left|Independent
|
|3.88%
|-
|style="background-color:"|
|align=left|Anatoly Milashevich
|align=left|Independent
|
|2.60%
|-
|style="background-color:#FCCA19"|
|align=left|Yevgeny Degtyarev
|align=left|Congress of Russian Communities-Yury Boldyrev Movement
|
|0.72%
|-
|style="background-color:#000000"|
|colspan=2 |against all
|
|18.83%
|-
| colspan="5" style="background-color:#E9E9E9;"|
|- style="font-weight:bold"
| colspan="3" style="text-align:left;" | Total
| 
| 100%
|-
| colspan="5" style="background-color:#E9E9E9;"|
|- style="font-weight:bold"
| colspan="4" |Source:
|
|}

2000

|-
! colspan=2 style="background-color:#E9E9E9;text-align:left;vertical-align:top;" |Candidate
! style="background-color:#E9E9E9;text-align:left;vertical-align:top;" |Party
! style="background-color:#E9E9E9;text-align:right;" |Votes
! style="background-color:#E9E9E9;text-align:right;" |%
|-
|style="background-color:"|
|align=left|Viktor Cherepkov
|align=left|Independent
|
|27.02%
|-
|style="background-color:"|
|align=left|Valentina Kudryavtseva
|align=left|Independent
|
|19.18%
|-
|style="background-color:"|
|align=left|Vladimir Boruchenko
|align=left|Independent
|
|19.18%
|-
|style="background-color:"|
|align=left|Gennady Kucherenko
|align=left|Independent
|
|8.79%
|-
|style="background-color:"|
|align=left|Sergey Solovyov
|align=left|Independent
|
|6.57%
|-
|style="background-color:"|
|align=left|Vasily Shirshikov
|align=left|Independent
|
|5.00%
|-
|style="background-color:"|
|align=left|Irina Tumanova
|align=left|Independent
|
|2.54%
|-
|style="background-color:"|
|align=left|Vitaly Poluyanov
|align=left|Independent
|
|1.84%
|-
|style="background-color:"|
|align=left|Zinovy Golovets
|align=left|Independent
|
|0.76%
|-
|style="background-color:"|
|align=left|Sergey Fokin
|align=left|Independent
|
|0.73%
|-
|style="background-color:"|
|align=left|Anatoly Shchebletov
|align=left|Independent
|
|0.42%
|-
|style="background-color:#000000"|
|colspan=2 |against all
|
|11.63%
|-
| colspan="5" style="background-color:#E9E9E9;"|
|- style="font-weight:bold"
| colspan="3" style="text-align:left;" | Total
| 
| 100%
|-
| colspan="5" style="background-color:#E9E9E9;"|
|- style="font-weight:bold"
| colspan="4" |Source:
|
|}

2003

|-
! colspan=2 style="background-color:#E9E9E9;text-align:left;vertical-align:top;" |Candidate
! style="background-color:#E9E9E9;text-align:left;vertical-align:top;" |Party
! style="background-color:#E9E9E9;text-align:right;" |Votes
! style="background-color:#E9E9E9;text-align:right;" |%
|-
|style="background-color:"|
|align=left|Viktor Cherepkov (incumbent)
|align=left|Independent
|
|31.55%
|-
|style="background-color:"|
|align=left|Pavel Patsvald
|align=left|Independent
|
|27.75%
|-
|style="background-color:"|
|align=left|Adam Imadayev
|align=left|Independent
|
|12.14%
|-
|style="background-color:"|
|align=left|Vladimir Kuznetsov
|align=left|Independent
|
|5.70%
|-
|style="background-color:"|
|align=left|Viktor Potapeyko
|align=left|Communist Party
|
|2.70%
|-
|style="background-color:"|
|align=left|Nikolay Beletsky
|align=left|Rodina
|
|2.63%
|-
|style="background-color:"|
|align=left|Valentin Kurayev
|align=left|Liberal Democratic Party
|
|1.47%
|-
|style="background-color:"|
|align=left|Aleksandr Tishchenko
|align=left|Agrarian Party
|
|1.38%
|-
|style="background-color:#1042A5"|
|align=left|Anatoly Novikov
|align=left|Union of Right Forces
|
|1.03%
|-
|style="background-color:"|
|align=left|Yevgeny Kolupayev
|align=left|Independent
|
|0.80%
|-
|style="background-color:#00A1FF"|
|align=left|Valentin Labonin
|align=left|Party of Russia's Rebirth-Russian Party of Life
|
|0.69%
|-
|style="background-color:#000000"|
|colspan=2 |against all
|
|10.75%
|-
| colspan="5" style="background-color:#E9E9E9;"|
|- style="font-weight:bold"
| colspan="3" style="text-align:left;" | Total
| 
| 100%
|-
| colspan="5" style="background-color:#E9E9E9;"|
|- style="font-weight:bold"
| colspan="4" |Source:
|
|}

2016

|-
! colspan=2 style="background-color:#E9E9E9;text-align:left;vertical-align:top;" |Candidate
! style="background-color:#E9E9E9;text-align:leftt;vertical-align:top;" |Party
! style="background-color:#E9E9E9;text-align:right;" |Votes
! style="background-color:#E9E9E9;text-align:right;" |%
|-
|style="background-color:"|
|align=left|Sergey Sopchuk
|align=left|United Russia
|
|39.53%
|-
|style="background-color:"|
|align=left|Anatoly Dolgachev
|align=left|Communist Party
|
|13.58%
|-
|style="background-color:"|
|align=left|Andrey Andreychenko
|align=left|Liberal Democratic Party
|
|11.74%
|-
|style="background:"| 
|align=left|Aleksandr Perednya
|align=left|A Just Russia
|
|8.21%
|-
|style="background-color:"|
|align=left|Viktor Cherepkov
|align=left|Rodina
|
|7.73%
|-
|style="background-color:"|
|align=left|Oleg Pak
|align=left|Party of Growth
|
|6.85%
|-
|style="background-color: " |
|align=left|Vitaly Libanov
|align=left|Communists of Russia
|
|3.88%
|-
|style="background:"| 
|align=left|Nikolay Markovtsev
|align=left|Yabloko
|
|3.39%
|-
| colspan="5" style="background-color:#E9E9E9;"|
|- style="font-weight:bold"
| colspan="3" style="text-align:left;" | Total
| 
| 100%
|-
| colspan="5" style="background-color:#E9E9E9;"|
|- style="font-weight:bold"
| colspan="4" |Source:
|
|}

2021

|-
! colspan=2 style="background-color:#E9E9E9;text-align:left;vertical-align:top;" |Candidate
! style="background-color:#E9E9E9;text-align:left;vertical-align:top;" |Party
! style="background-color:#E9E9E9;text-align:right;" |Votes
! style="background-color:#E9E9E9;text-align:right;" |%
|-
|style="background-color:"|
|align=left|Aleksandr Shcherbakov
|align=left|United Russia
|
|34.59%
|-
|style="background-color:"|
|align=left|Artyom Samsonov
|align=left|Communist Party
|
|22.40%
|-
|style="background-color:"|
|align=left|Andrey Andreychenko
|align=left|Liberal Democratic Party
|
|10.09%
|-
|style="background-color: " |
|align=left|Vitaly Libanov
|align=left|Communists of Russia
|
|7.83%
|-
|style="background-color: " |
|align=left|Maksim Beloborodov
|align=left|A Just Russia — For Truth
|
|7.22%
|-
|style="background-color:"|
|align=left|Oleg Nisenbaum
|align=left|Party of Pensioners
|
|4.75%
|-
|style="background-color:"|
|align=left|Sergey Matlin
|align=left|Party of Growth
|
|2.29%
|-
|style="background-color:"|
|align=left|Darya Sapronova
|align=left|The Greens
|
|2.18%
|-
|style="background-color:"|
|align=left|Svetlana Petropavlova
|align=left|Rodina
|
|1.50%
|-
|style="background-color:"|
|align=left|Aleksandr Filkov
|align=left|Russian Party of Freedom and Justice
|
|1.30%
|-
| colspan="5" style="background-color:#E9E9E9;"|
|- style="font-weight:bold"
| colspan="3" style="text-align:left;" | Total
| 
| 100%
|-
| colspan="5" style="background-color:#E9E9E9;"|
|- style="font-weight:bold"
| colspan="4" |Source:
|
|}

Notes

References

Russian legislative constituencies
Politics of Primorsky Krai